Rhodium(III) sulfate refers to inorganic compounds of the formula Rh2(SO4)3. It is a red crystalline solid.

Preparation
The first attempts to produce rhodium(III) sulfate was in 1929 with the reaction of rhodium(III) hydroxide and sulfuric acid . They reported that there were two different types of hydrates, the yellow colored tetradecahydrate and the red colored tetrahydrate. This not conformed due to the lack of structural proof. Then further investigations has been done on the hexahydrate and the tetradecahydrate with x-ray diffraction. The first structural elucidations have been done at 2009 which conformed the existence of the chemical.

Then at 2016, a much efficient production method was reported. This method used rhodium metal and sulfuric acid to make the rhodium(III) sulfate. The two compounds were heated together at 400°C to make the anhydrous compound. It was shown that if it was heated at 475°C instead, it would make the dihydrate.

References

Rhodium(III) compounds
Sulfates